Václav Benák (born August 30, 1978) is a Czech professional ice hockey defenceman. He played with HC Plzeň in the Czech Extraliga during the 2010–11 Czech Extraliga season.

Benák previously played for HC Sparta Praha, HC České Budějovice, IHC Písek, HC Znojemští Orli and HK36 Skalica.

References

External links

1978 births
Living people
Czech ice hockey defencemen
HC Plzeň players
Motor České Budějovice players
HC Sparta Praha players
HC Karlovy Vary players
HC Dynamo Pardubice players
HC Davos players
HK 36 Skalica players
Orli Znojmo players
IHC Písek players
Czech expatriate ice hockey players in Germany
Czech expatriate ice hockey players in Switzerland
People from Sokolov
Sportspeople from the Karlovy Vary Region